Paolo Vitelli may refer to:

Paolo Vitelli (condottiero) (1461–1499), lord of Montone
Paolo II Vitelli (1519–1574), marquess of Cetona and Carmiano
Paolo Vitelli (businessman) (born 1947), Italian entrepreneur